Bear Valley is a ski area in the western United States, located in the Sierra Nevada of California on Highway 4 between Lake Tahoe and Yosemite—about three hours southeast of Sacramento and one hour from Angels Camp. The alpine ski area and a portion of the real estate in the village of Bear Valley was owned by an investment partnership led by a Canadian company, Dundee Realty, from 2005 to 2014, when Skyline International acquired Bear Valley.

Skiing
Nine lifts provide access to 75+ runs covering . Prior to the 2010–11 season, an additional  of non-lift serviced terrain was opened to the public expanding the resort to 1680 skiable acres, making it the eighth largest in skiable acres in California.  The resort is known for its commitment to snow making and snow science expertise, and as a result of snow management, was one of six resorts in California that remained open into mid-spring during the worst droughts in history.

Bear Valley is also known for its rich racing history and one of two resorts in the state  that operates a NASTAR course nearly every weekend of the winter season.  In 2015, the ski area's season pass became valid at both the alpine and cross country ski area.  Known as "The Forever Pass" the pass gives access to unlimited downhill and cross country ski trails during the winter season.  The Bear Valley Cross Country and Snowshoe Trail System consists of 35 trails covering  of terrain. Bear Valley Cross Country is owned and operated by Paul and Diane Petersen. Paul Petersen is co-author of The Essential Cross Country Skier: A Step By Step Guide and a pioneer in the Nordic skiing industry in California.

The Bear Valley back country offers endless options to access the back country via alpine touring, telemark, and back country skis or snow shoes. Mountain Adventure Seminars, based in Bear Valley, offers instruction in telemark skiing, avalanche safety skills, mountaineering guide services, and extended overnight tours of the surrounding back country. MAS, in conjunction with Bear Valley Mountain Resort, also offers snow cat assisted tours of both back country and side country ski areas outside the patrolled areas of the alpine resort.

Base facilities
The base village includes a hotel, spa, cabins, 2 restaurants, 2 full bars, and a pizza parlor.  The Lodge at the base facility is known for its majestic granite fireplace and post and beam construction of the atrium style hotel.  The hotel's Cathedral Lounge is a desired location for weddings and special events.  The village also includes a US Post Office, museum, general store and snowmobile rental center. There is also an Alpine County Sheriff's office and fire station, as well as a County library and K-6 public school. On summer weekends and holidays, there is bus service to Lake Alpine, which is a popular nearby recreation area and lodge.  In winter months, there is a shuttle to the ski area in daily operation.

Bear Valley Music Festival 
Since 1969, Bear Valley has hosted the annual Bear Valley Music Festival.  The festival, which begins at the end of July and runs for 2 weeks and 3 weekends, includes a variety of music, including contemporary bands and classical concerts featuring a full symphony orchestra conducted by Maestro Alexander Mickelthwate.

Future development plans 
A lift from town has been planned for years, as is a mountain top day lodge and terrain expansion. In early 2013, the partnership that owns the ski area operation and a portion of the real estate in town decided to sell their holdings which now include entitlements for over 300 condominium homes. In September 2013, a deal to sell the ski area operation fell through. In December 2013 a group of Bear Valley property owners announced an initiative to explore community ownership options for both the ski area operation and the village. In February 2014, the Bear Valley Mountain Cooperative was formed with the objective of acquiring and managing those assets on behalf of the community. In 2014, the resort was acquired by Skyline International and currently owns and operates the resort.

References

External links
 
 Bear Valley Music Festival
3dSkiMap of Bear Valley Mountain Resort
 SkiMap.org – Bear Valley

Ski areas and resorts in California
Companies based in Alpine County, California
Stanislaus National Forest
Tourist attractions in Alpine County, California